Nikola Burazer (Serbian: Никола Буразер; born 22 July 1988) is a Serbian political scientist, journalist, program director of Center for Contemporary Politics and executive editor of European Western Balkans.

Biography 
He was born on 22 July 1988 in Belgrade where he finished elementary school "Borislav Pekić" and Seventh Belgrade Gymnasium.

In 2011, he graduated in political science at the University of Belgrade Faculty of Political Sciences, and successfully defended his MA thesis "From Segmentation to Dissolution: The Segmental Institutions Thesis and the Case of Yugoslavia” at the Central European University in Budapest.

During 2013 he was a researcher at the Forum for Ethic Relations in Belgrade, where he did a research on the normalization of relations between Kosovo and Serbia. In July 2015, he became an executive editor at the European Western Balkans portal and the program director of Center for Contemporary Politics.

From September to December 2015, he was a researcher at the Institute for Development and International Relations in Zagreb. During 2017, he was a teaching course "Nationalism and Ethnic Conflicts in the Balkans" at the Mathias Corvinus Collegium in Budapest.

From December 2017 until February 2018 he was a research fellow at the Balkans in Europe Policy Advisory Group (BiEPAG). In September 2018, he co-authored and promoted the shadow report "State of Democracy in Serbia 2018". He coauthored with Đorđe Bojović publication "Agreement on Comprehensive Normalization of Relations between Serbia and Kosovo – Political and Legal Analysis" in November 2018.

Selected bibliography

References

External links 
Text of Nikola Burazer for Večernje novosti (in Serbian) from 24 May 2016

University of Belgrade alumni
Central European University alumni
Serbian political scientists
1988 births
Living people
Writers from Belgrade